The 2019 Eastbourne International (also known as the Nature Valley International for sponsorship reasons) was a combined men's and women's tennis tournament played on outdoor grass courts. It was the 45th edition of the event for the women and the 9th edition for the men. The tournament was classified as a WTA Premier tournament on the 2019 WTA Tour and as an ATP Tour 250 series on the 2019 ATP Tour. The tournament took place at the Devonshire Park Lawn Tennis Club in Eastbourne, United Kingdom between 23 and 29 June 2019.

Points and prize money

Point distribution

Prize money

ATP singles main draw entrants

Seeds

 1 Rankings are as of 17 June 2019.

Other entrants
The following players received wildcards into the main draw:
  Jay Clarke
  Kyle Edmund  
  Dan Evans

The following player received entry as a special exempt:
  Feliciano López

The following players received entry from the qualifying draw:
  Thomas Fabbiano 
  Paul Jubb 
  Tennys Sandgren
  James Ward

The following players received entry as lucky losers:
  Denis Kudla
  Juan Ignacio Londero

Withdrawals
Before the tournament
  Matteo Berrettini → replaced by  Juan Ignacio Londero
  Richard Gasquet → replaced by  Sam Querrey
  Philipp Kohlschreiber → replaced by  Steve Johnson
  Feliciano López → replaced by  Denis Kudla

ATP doubles main draw entrants

Seeds

1 Rankings are as of 17 June 2019.

Other entrants
The following pairs received wildcards into the doubles main draw:
  Scott Clayton /  James Ward 
  Dan Evans /  Lloyd Glasspool

The following pairs received entry as alternates:
  Nicholas Monroe /  Fernando Verdasco

Withdrawals
Before the tournament
  Leonardo Mayer

WTA singles main draw entrants

Seeds

 1 Rankings are as of 17 June 2019.

Other entrants
The following players received wildcards into the main draw:
  Harriet Dart
  Simona Halep
  Angelique Kerber
  Katie Swan
  Heather Watson

The following player received entry using a protected ranking into the singles main draw:
  Anna-Lena Friedsam

The following players received entry from the qualifying draw:
  Fiona Ferro
  Polona Hercog
  Veronika Kudermetova
  Jessica Pegula
  Samantha Stosur
  Dayana Yastremska

The following players received entry as lucky losers:
  Zarina Diyas
  Daria Gavrilova
  Viktorija Golubic
  Magda Linette
  Pauline Parmentier
 Mandy Minella

Withdrawals
Before the tournament
  Bianca Andreescu → replaced by  Evgeniya Rodina
  Ashleigh Barty → replaced by  Mandy Minella
  Dominika Cibulková → replaced by  Rebecca Peterson
  Julia Görges → replaced by  Zarina Diyas
  Tatjana Maria → replaced by  Andrea Petkovic
  Anastasia Pavlyuchenkova → replaced by  Tamara Zidanšek
  Alison Riske → replaced by   Magda Linette
  Anastasija Sevastova → replaced by  Viktorija Golubic
  Donna Vekić → replaced by   Daria Gavrilova
  Wang Qiang → replaced by  Pauline Parmentier

During the tournament
  Ons Jabeur (right ankle injury)

Retirements
  Danielle Collins (low back injury)
  Jeļena Ostapenko (left hip injury)
  Barbora Strýcová (left lower leg injury)

WTA doubles main draw entrants

Seeds

1 Rankings are as of 17 June 2019.

Other entrants
The following pair received a wildcard into the doubles main draw:
  Harriet Dart /  Heather Watson

The following pairs received entry as alternates:
  Mihaela Buzărnescu /  Anna-Lena Friedsam
  Darija Jurak /  Katarina Srebotnik

Withdrawals
Before the tournament
  Jeļena Ostapenko (left hip injury)
  Zheng Saisai (left hip injury)

During the tournament
  Vera Zvonareva (left wrist injury)

Finals

Men's singles

  Taylor Fritz defeated  Sam Querrey, 6–3, 6–4

Women's singles

  Karolína Plíšková defeated  Angelique Kerber, 6–1, 6–4

Men's doubles

  Juan Sebastián Cabal /  Robert Farah defeated  Máximo González /  Horacio Zeballos, 3–6, 7–6(7–4), [10–6]

Women's doubles

  Chan Hao-ching /  Latisha Chan defeated  Kirsten Flipkens /  Bethanie Mattek-Sands, 2–6, 6–3, [10–6]

References

External links
 Website

2019 in English tennis
Eastbourne International
2019
June 2019 sports events in the United Kingdom